is a junction passenger railway station in the city of Isesaki, Gunma Prefecture, Japan, jointly operated by East Japan Railway Company (JR East) and the private railway operator Tōbu Railway.

Lines
Isesaki Station is a station on the JR East Ryōmō Line, and is located 69.1 kilometers from the terminus of the line at Oyama Station. It also forms the northern terminus of the Tōbu Isesaki Line, and is 114.5 kilometers from the starting point of the line at Asakusa Station in Tokyo.

Station layout

JR Station

The JR East station consists of two elevated island platforms serving four tracks, with the station building underneath. The station has a Midori no Madoguchi staffed ticket office.

Tōbu Station

The Tōbu Station consists of one elevated island platform serving two tracks, with the station building located underneath.

Platforms

History
What is now the JR East Isesaki Station opened on 20 November 1889. The Tobu Railway station opened on 13 July 1910.

From 17 March 2012, station numbering was introduced on all Tōbu lines, with Isesaki Station becoming "TI-25".

New elevated platforms were brought into use from 19 October 2013.

Passenger statistics
In fiscal 2019, the Tōbu station was used by an average of 11,341 passengers daily. The JR East station was used by 6058 passengers (alighting) daily.

Surrounding area
Isesaki Post Office
Isesaki Jinja

Bus routes
SILK LINER (Nippon Chuo Bus)
For Osaka City Air Terminal
Sendai Liner (Nippon Chuo Bus)
For Sendai Station (Miyagi)
Shinjuku-Honjo/Isesaki Line (JR Bus Kanto)
For Shinjuku Station
Kokusai Juo Bus
For Honjo Station (Saitama) and Honjo-Waseda Station
Gunma Chuo Bus
For Gunma Prefectural Women's University (Runs on weekdays only)

See also
 List of railway stations in Japan

References

External links

 Isesaki Station (JR East) 
 Isesaki Station  (Tobu Railway) 

Railway stations in Gunma Prefecture
Ryōmō Line
Tobu Isesaki Line
Stations of Tobu Railway
Stations of East Japan Railway Company
Railway stations in Japan opened in 1889